Alongside its importance in the Hindu faith, the Bhagavad Gita has influenced many thinkers, musicians including Sri Aurobindo, Swami Vivekananda, Mahatma Gandhi, Aldous Huxley, Henry David Thoreau, J. Robert Oppenheimer, Ralph Waldo Emerson, Carl Jung, Bulent Ecevit, Hermann Hesse, Heinrich Himmler, George Harrison, Nikola Tesla among others. The main source of the doctrine of Karma Yoga in its present form is Bhagavad Gita.

Famous reflections
Adi Shankaracharya
This is what he thought of the Bhagavad Gita:

Ramanujacharya
Acharya Ramanuja (1017-1137) was like Adi Shankaracharya, a great exponent of Vishistadvaita Vedanta.

{{blockquote|"The Bhagavad-Gita was spoken by Lord Krishna to reveal the science of devotion to God which is the essence of all spiritual  knowledge."
The Supreme Lord Krishna's primary purpose for descending and incarnating is to relieve the world of any demoniac and negative, undesirable influences that are opposed to spiritual development, yet simultaneously it is His incomparable intention to be perpetually within reach of all humanity."}}

A. C. Bhaktivedanta Swami Prabhupada (author of Bhagavad-Gita As It Is)
Our only purpose is to present this Bhagavad-gītā As It Is in order to guide the conditioned student to the same purpose for which Kṛṣṇa descends to this planet once in a day of Brahmā, or every 8,600,000,000 years. This purpose is stated in Bhagavad-gītā, and we have to accept it as it is; otherwise there is no point in trying to understand the Bhagavad-gītā and its speaker, Lord Kṛṣṇa. Lord Kṛṣṇa first spoke Bhagavad-gītā to the sun-god some hundreds of millions of years ago. We have to accept this fact and thus understand the historical significance of Bhagavad-gītā, without misinterpretation, on the authority of Kṛṣṇa. To interpret Bhagavad-gītā without any reference to the will of Kṛṣṇa is the greatest offense. In order to save oneself from this offense, one has to understand the Lord as the Supreme Personality of Godhead, as He was directly understood by Arjuna, Lord Kṛṣṇa's first disciple. Such understanding of Bhagavad-gītā is really profitable and authorized for the welfare of human society in fulfilling the mission of life.

Swami Vivekananda
Swami Vivekananda evinced much interest in Bhagavad Gita. It is said, Bhagavad Gita was one of his two most favourite books (another one was The Imitation of Christ). In 1888-1893 when Vivekananda was travelling all over India as a wandering monk, he kept only two books with him — Gita and Imitation of Christ.

Mohandas Karamchand Gandhi
The Bhagavad Gitas emphasis on selfless service was a prime source of inspiration for Mohandas Karamchand Gandhi. Gandhi told-"When doubts haunt me, when disappointments stare me in the face, and I see not one ray of hope on the horizon, I turn to Bhagavad-Gita and find a verse to comfort me; and I immediately begin to smile in the midst of overwhelming sorrow. Those who meditate on the Gita will derive fresh joy and new meanings from it every day".

Sri Aurobindo
According to Sri Aurobindo, the "Bhagavad-Gita is a true scripture of the human race a living creation rather than a book, with a new message for every age and a new meaning for every civilization."

Aldous Huxley
Aldous Huxley, the English writer found Gita "the most systematic statement of spiritual evolution of endowing value to mankind.", He also felt, Gita is "one of the most clear and comprehensive summaries of perennial philosophy ever revealed; hence its enduring value is subject not only to India but to all of humanity."

Jawaharlal Nehru
Jawaharlal Nehru, the first prime minister of India found that "The Bhagavad Gita deals essentially with the spiritual foundation of human existence. It is a call of action to meet the obligations and duties of life; yet keeping in view the spiritual nature and grander purpose of the universe."

J. Robert Oppenheimer

J. Robert Oppenheimer, American physicist and director of the Manhattan Project, learned Sanskrit in 1933 and read the Bhagavad Gita in the original form, citing it later as one of the most influential books to shape his philosophy of life. Oppenheimer later recalled that, while witnessing the explosion of the Trinity nuclear test, he thought of verses from the Bhagavad Gita (XI,12):

Years later he would explain that another verse had also entered his head at that time:

Henry David Thoreau
Henry David Thoreau wrote "In the morning I bathe my intellect in the stupendous and cosmogonal philosophy of the Bhagavad Gita in comparison with which our modern world and its literature seem puny and trivial."

Hermann Graf Keyserling
Hermann Graf Keyserling, German Philosopher regarded Bhagavad-Gita as "Perhaps the most beautiful work of the literature of the world."

Hermann Hesse
Hermann Hesse felt that "the marvel of the Bhagavad-Gita is its truly beautiful revelation of life's wisdom which enables philosophy to blossom into religion."

Ralph Waldo Emerson
Ralph Waldo Emerson said this about the Bhagavad Gita: "I owed a magnificent day to the Bhagavad-Gita. It was as if an empire spoke to us, nothing small or unworthy, but large, serene, consistent,the voice of an old intelligence which in another age and climate had pondered and thus disposed of the same questions which exercise us."

Wilhelm von Humboldt
Wilhelm von Humboldt pronounced the Gita as: "The most beautiful, perhaps the only true philosophical song existing in any known tongue ... perhaps the deepest and loftiest thing the world has to show."

Bulent Ecevit
Turkish Ex prime minister Bulent Ecevit, when asked what had given him the courage to send Turkish troops to Cyprus . His answer was "He was fortified by the Bhagavad Gita which taught that if one were morally right, one need not hesitate to fight injustice".

Lord Warren Hastings
Lord Warren Hastings, the first governor general of British India wrote: "I hesitate not to pronounce the Gita a performance of great originality, of sublimity of conception, reasoning and diction almost unequalled; and a single exception, amongst all the known religions of mankind."

Sunita Williams 
Sunita Williams, an American astronaut who holds the record for longest single space flight by a woman carried a copy of Bhagavad Gita and Upanishads with her to space, said "Those are  spiritual things to reflect upon yourself,life, world around you and see things other way, I thought it was quite appropriate" while talking about her time in space.

Annie Besant
"That the spiritual man need not be a recluse, that union with the divine Life may be achieved and maintained in the midst of worldly affairs, that the obstacles to that union lie not outside us but within us—such is the central lesson of the Bhagavad-Gītā." - Annie Besant

Rudolf Steiner
"If we want to approach such a creation as sublime as the Bhagavad-gita with full understanding it is necessary for us to attune our souls to it. "- Rudolf Steiner

E. Sreedharan
"You see, spirituality has no religious overtones. The essence of spirituality is to make a person pure in his mind and his thoughts. When I started reading our old scriptures, like the “Baghavad Gita,” I found it was useful for day-to-day life, so I started practicing it. I consider it an administrative gospel, one that will help you in doing things like running an organization".

A. P. J. Abdul Kalam
A. P. J. Abdul Kalam, 11th President of India, despite being a Muslim, used to read Bhagavad Gita and recite mantras.

Narendra D Modi 
Prime Minister of India, Narendra Modi has strongly pitched the Bhagavad Gita as "India's biggest gift to the world". Shri Modi gifted the Bhagavad Gita'' according to Gandhi to the then President of the United States Barack Obama in 2014 during his US visit.

 Will Smith
Hollywood actor Will smith said "I am 90% through the Bhagavad Gita... My inner Arjuna is being channelled.

Notes

References

Krishna
Bhagavad Gita
Bhagavad Gita